A goalie, goalkeeper or goaltender is a designated player in many sports who is charged with directly preventing the opposing team from scoring by intercepting shots at goal.

Specific goalie positions include:
 Goalie (association football)
 Goalie (handball)
 Goalie (ice hockey)
 Lacrosse:
 Goalie (box lacrosse)
 Goalie (field lacrosse)
 Goalie (water polo)

Goalie may also refer to:
 Goalie (comics), a character in the UK comic The Beano
 Goalie (film), a 2019 Canadian film about Terry Sawchuk
 "Goalie Goalie", 2018 football-related song by singers Arash, Nyusha, Pitbull; and record producer Blanco

See also 
 Rush goalie, also known as a fly goalie or fly keeper, is a variation of association football in which the role of the goalkeeper is more flexible
 Goalkeeper (disambiguation)
 Rent-a-Goalie, a Canadian comedy television series that aired on Showcase from 2006 to 2008